UltraVNC (sometimes written uVNC) is an open-source remote-administration/remote-desktop-software utility. The client supports Microsoft Windows and Linux but the server only supports Windows. It uses the VNC protocol to control/access another computer remotely over a network connection.

Features
UltraVNC allows the use of a remote computer as if the user were in front of it. This is achieved by sending mouse movements and key-presses to the remote computer, and replicating the remote computer's display (subject to differences in resolution) locally in real time. UltraVNC bears a strong resemblance to RealVNC Free Edition. However, in addition to remote control, it adds various features, such as an encryption plugin to secure the client/server connection. It also supports file transfers, chat functionality and various authentication methods. The two computers must be able to communicate across a network, such as a local subnet, internal network, or the Internet. The software is free and distributed under the terms of the GNU General Public License.

It can use an optional mirror driver, to be installed on the remotely controlled computer, for fast and efficient notification of screen changes with very low CPU load, although this is not  needed on latest versions of Windows 10.

History
UltraVNC is developed in the C, C++, and Java programming languages.

The 1.0.6.4 release added support for working as a Windows service under User Account Control (UAC).

Reverse control
UltraVNC is notable as the base for free no-install remote help desk options including UltraVNC Single Click ("SC") and PCHelpWare. These operate by generating pre-configured executables that can be downloaded and run on systems needing support; these applications then connect back to server software running on the system providing support.

See also

 RFB protocol
 Comparison of remote desktop software

References

External links

 

Windows-only free software
Remote administration software
Virtual Network Computing
Portable software
Free software programmed in C
Free software programmed in C++
Free software programmed in Java (programming language)